Platystrophia is an extinct genus of brachiopods that lived from the Ordovician to the Silurian in Asia, Europe, North America, and South America. It has a prominent sulcus and fold. It usually lived in marine lime mud and sands.

Distribution 
Platystrophia ponderosa has been found in the Fairview and Oregonia (=Arnheim) Formations, Platystrophia clarksvillensis in the Waynesville and Liberty Formations, and Platystrophia cypha from Grant Lake to the Liberty Formations. In South America, the genus is found in the Ordovician San Juan Formation of Argentina and the Caparo Formation of Venezuela.

Species
Species in the genus Platystrophia include:

P. acutilirata (Conrad, 1842)
P. amoena McEwan, 1919
P. annieana Foerste, 1910
P. anomala Hiller, 1980
P. baltica Zuykov and Harper, 2007
P. biforatus (Schlotheim, 1820)
P. caelata Williams, 1974
P. chama Eichwald, 1861
P. clarkvillensis Foerste, 1910
P. colbiensis Foerste, 1910
P. costata Zuykov, 2000
P. costatus (Pander, 1830)
P. crassoplicata Alichova, 1951
P. cypha (James, 1874)
P. dentata Pander, 1830
P. elegantula McEwan, 1919
P. extensa McEwan, 1920
P. hongueda 
P. hopensis (Foerste, 1910)
P. humilis Li and Copper, 2006
P. laticosta (James, 1871)
P. lutkevichi Alikhova, 1951
P. lynx Eichwald, 1830
P. orbiculata Oraspold, 1959
P. pogrebovi Zuykov and Harper, 2007
P. ponderosa Foerste, 1909
P. profundosulcata (Meek, 1873)
P. putilovensis Zuykov, 1999
P. quadriplicata Alikhova, 1951
P. saxbyensis Oraspold, 1959
P. scotica Williams, 1962
P. tramorensis Liljeroth et al., 2017
P. trentonensis McEwan, 1919

References

Further reading 
 Fossils (Smithsonian Handbooks) by David Ward (Page 79)

Rhynchonellata
Prehistoric brachiopod genera
Ordovician brachiopods
Silurian brachiopods
Paleozoic animals of Asia
Paleozoic animals of Europe
Paleozoic animals of North America
Paleozoic brachiopods of South America
Ordovician Argentina
Fossils of Argentina
Fossils of Belarus
Fossils of Belgium
Fossils of Canada
Fossils of China
Fossils of Estonia
Fossils of Ireland
Fossils of Jordan
Fossils of Latvia
Fossils of Lithuania
Fossils of the Netherlands
Fossils of Norway
Fossils of Russia
Fossils of Spain
Fossils of Sweden
Fossils of Great Britain
Fossils of the United States
Ordovician Venezuela
Fossils of Venezuela
Ordovician first appearances
Silurian extinctions
Fossils of Georgia (U.S. state)
Paleozoic life of Ontario
Verulam Formation
Paleozoic life of British Columbia
Paleozoic life of Manitoba
Paleozoic life of the Northwest Territories
Paleozoic life of Nunavut
Paleozoic life of Quebec
Fossil taxa described in 1850